Flatey is an island of the western islands, a cluster of about forty large and small islands and islets located in Breiðafjörður on the northwestern part of Iceland. Flatey and its surrounding islands are, as a creation, believed to have forged from under the weight of a great glacier during the previous Ice age. In terms of size, Flatey is some two kilometers long and about one kilometer wide, of which most is flat land (hence its name, meaning "flat island" in Icelandic), with scarcely any hills to be found.

The island has a seasonal habitation; most houses there are occupied only during summer. In winter, the island's total population is five people. In spite of this, Flatey used to be one of the main cultural centres of Iceland, with its no-longer existing monastery (founded in 1172) standing on the highest point of the island as its beacon of knowledge. In the middle of the 19th century, Flatey was still a cultural and artistic centre but doubled as a hub of commerce for the northwest, having received its town charter from the Danish crown in 1777.

From 1777 and on until around the latter part of the last century, Flatey enjoyed a healthy growth of its population and was for a long time, relative to size, massively populated. 
Due to social change and changes of production and ensuing change of values and demands in the work place, its steady population has dwindled down to the minimum needed to support the community on a regular basis, a community which, during summer and holidays, multiplies in size due to a massive influx of second home owners, regular domestic visitors and foreign tourists.

The island has only a single road, which leads from the ferry dock to the so-called "old village", which consists of some restored and traditionally-painted old houses of the island's original inhabitants. There is, of course, also the old harbour, from where besides visitors and inhabitants travelling to and fro, the island's sheep are taken over to the mainland for slaughter. Besides sheep, most of Flatey's natural life consists of various kinds of mostly migratory birds, especially the puffin.

Flatey also has a church, built in 1926. The church's interior is painted with scenes of the island life, made by a Spanish painter, in the 1960s in return for free accommodation when he was visiting the island. The island also inhabits the oldest and smallest library in Iceland, established in 1864. This library was once home to the Flatey Book, the largest of medieval Icelandic manuscripts.

References 

 Þorsteinn Jósepsson, Steindór Steindórsson og Páll Líndal: Landið þitt Ísland, A-G, Örn og Örlygur, 1982. 
 Björn Hróarsson: Á ferð um landið, Borgarfjörður og Mýrar, Mál og menning, 1994.

External links

 Flatey information 
 Flatey information on the Internet Archive 

Western Region (Iceland)
Populated places in Iceland
Islands of Iceland